Vahlberg is a municipality in Wolfenbüttel, a district in Lower Saxony, Germany.

References

Wolfenbüttel (district)